David Biespiel is an American poet, memoirist, and critic born in 1964 and raised in the Meyerland section of Houston, Texas. He is the founder of the Attic Institute of Arts and Letters in Portland, Oregon and Poet-in-Residence at Oregon State University.

Biography
The youngest of three sons, David Biespiel—pronounced buy-speel—attended Beth Yeshurun, the oldest Jewish school in Houston. Reared in a family that valued athletic excellence (one brother was a member of the United States Gymnastics team), he competed in the U.S. Diving Championships against Olympians Greg Louganis and Bruce Kimball, and later coached and developed regional and national champions and finalists in diving. In 1982 he moved to Boston on a diving scholarship at Boston University. In 1989 he moved to Washington, D.C., where he studied with Stanley Plumly at the University of Maryland, as well as with Michael Collier and Phillis Levin. He later held a Stegner Fellowship in Poetry Stanford University.

Career

Biespiel began publishing poems and essays in 1986 after moving to remote Brownsville, Vermont. From 1988 to 1993 he lived and wrote in Washington, D.C., and from 1993 to 1995 in San Francisco. He has lived in Portland, Oregon since 1995.

He is a contributor to American Poetry Review, The New Republic, The New Yorker, Poetry, and Slate, and among other literary journals. He also has reviewed poetry for nearly fifteen years in journals and newspapers, including in Bookforum, The Washington Post, and The New York Times. In 2003 he was appointed the poetry columnist for The Oregonian, writing a monthly column until its end in September 2013. In 2015 he began a series of reviews for American Poetry Review.

In 1999, he founded the Attic Institute of Arts and Letters, an independent literary studio. Faculty and Teaching Fellows at the Attic Institute have included: Marc Acito, Matthew Dickman, Jennifer Lauck, Elizabeth Rusch, Kim Stafford, and Cheryl Strayed, among others.

In 2005 he was named editor of Poetry Northwest — one of the nation's oldest magazines devoted exclusively to poetry. Appointed by the University of Washington, Biespiel moved the magazine's offices to Portland. He served as editor until 2010.

During 2008–2012 Biespiel was a regular contributor to The Politico's Arena, a cross-party, cross-discipline daily conversation about politics and policy among current and former members of Congress, governors, mayors, political strategists and scholars.

In 2009 he helped formed the trio Incorporamento. The artistic group includes Oregon Ballet Theater principal dancer Gavin Larsen and musician Joshua Pearl. 

In 2009 he was elected by the membership of the National Book Critics Circle to the Board of Directors and served as a judge for the annual NBCC book awards. He was reelected in 2012 for a second term. During 2012–2014 he was chair of its award committee on Poetry. In 2018 he was named a finalist for the Nona Balakian Citation for Excellence in Reviewing.

In 2010, Biespiel sparked a national debate about the relationship between poets and democracy with the publication of his essay, "This Land Is Our Land", in Poetry.

In 2012 he began writing Poetry Wire for the Rumpus Magazine, focusing on topics such as poetry, politics, and cultural issues. 

He has taught creative writing and literature throughout the United States, including at George Washington University, University of Maryland, Stanford University, Portland State University, Lynchburg College, and Wake Forest University. He currently teaches at Oregon State University where he is the university's Poet-in-Residence.

Awards 
National Book Critics Circle Balakian Award, finalist, 2019/2018
Oregon Book Award in Nonfiction, A Long High Whistle, 2016
Oregon Book Award in Poetry, The Book of Men and Women, 2011
Lannan Fellowship, 2007
Pacific Northwest Bookseller's Award, A Long Journey, 2006
National Endowment for the Arts, 1997
Stegner Fellowship, 1993–1995

Publications

Books
A Place of Exodus, 2020
Republic Cafe, 2019
The Education of a Young Poet, 2017
A Long High Whistle, 2015
Charming Gardeners, 2013
Every Writer Has a Thousand Faces, 2010
The Book of Men and Women, 2009
Wild Civility, 2003
Pilgrims & Beggars, 2002
Shattering Air, 1996

Edited Collections
Poems of the American South (Random House: Everyman's Library Pocket Poets), 2014
Long Journey: Contemporary Northwest Poets (Awarded the Pacific Northwest Bookseller's Award), 2006

Recording
Citizen Dave: Selected Poems 1996–2010

References

1964 births
Poets from Oregon
Boston University alumni
Living people
Pacific Lutheran University faculty
Writers from Portland, Oregon
Jewish American writers
Jewish poets
The Oregonian people
21st-century American poets
21st-century American Jews